Barlow is a Canadian singer-songwriter and musician. He is best known for his 2003 hit, "Walk Away," from his self-titled 2004 album. He has been nominated for four Juno Awards and won the Canadian Rising Star Award. Radio Music Award nomination.

Biography

Early life
He was born as Tom Barlow in North York, Ontario, Canada. In 1985, Barlow began playing music in clubs and writing songs to pay for his university education. He graduated from York University in 1991 with a Bachelor of Arts and a Bachelor of Education.

2003–2005: Barlow
In August 2003, his self-titled debut album was released on Sony  The album included the singles, "Walk Away", "Married by Elvis", and "Perfect Wave". The album was nominated for Pop Album of the Year at the 2004 Juno Awards.  He was also nominated as Best New Artist. The music video for the song "Perfect Wave" was nominated for Video of the Year at the 2005 Juno Awards.

Discography

Albums

Singles

Awards and nominations

Further reading

References
Citations

Year of birth missing (living people)
Living people
People from North York
Canadian male singers
Canadian rock singers
Canadian singer-songwriters
Former Latter Day Saints
Canadian rock guitarists
Canadian male guitarists
Musicians from Toronto
Canadian male singer-songwriters